Kundali River is a river originating in the Kundali Hills of the Western Ghats in the state of Maharashtra and flowing into the Upper Bhima River Basin. From its origin to Shrwati dam, Kundali River waters are rated as  A-1 class, and from Vadivale dam to its confluence with Indryani River its waters are rated as A-B class.

The Kundli Pumped Storage plan set forth a long-standing idea of Tata Power with the goal of implementing a fast-track plan of storing the water of the Kundli river in the Valwahan Dam at Lonavala during the monsoon season by constructing a dam at Shirwata, about 55 km. away, and then moving the water by gravity through a tunnel at Somwadi.

Reference notes

External links
 Plans for Pumping (PDF)

Rivers of Maharashtra
Rivers of India